This is an incomplete list of military and other armed confrontations that have occurred within the boundaries of the modern US State of Nebraska since European contact. The region was part of the Viceroyalty of New Spain from 1535–1679, New France from 1679–1803, and part of the United States of America 1803–present.

The Plains Indian Wars directly affected the region during westward expansion.

Battles

Notes

See also
 History of Nebraska
 Plains Indians Wars

Nebraska-related lists